Baron Emanuel A. von der Pahlen (4 July 1882–18 July 1952) was a German astronomer.

He was born in St. Petersburg, Russia, but left for Germany
following the revolution of 1917. He was
educated at University of Göttingen, where he was awarded a Doctorate of Mathematical Sciences. Prior to World War I he joined solar eclipse expeditions in 1905, 1912 and 1914. Between the  world wars, he was employed at the Astrophysikalishen Observatorium Potsdam. He taught at the University of Basel. In 1947 he published Einführung in die Dynamik von Sternsystemen, a 241-page work on Galaxies.

The crater Von der Pahlen on the Moon is named after him.

References
 
 
 

1882 births
1952 deaths
20th-century German astronomers
Emanuel
Soviet emigrants to Germany